Whale Wars is a weekly American documentary-style reality television series that premiered on November 7, 2008, on the Animal Planet cable channel. The program follows Paul Watson, founder of the Sea Shepherd Conservation Society, as he and his crew aboard their various vessels attempt to deter Japanese whaling off the coast of Antarctica. The fourth season concluded on August 12, 2011.

A spin-off titled Whale Wars: Viking Shores features the Sea Shepherd trying to stop Whaling in the Faroe Islands. The spin-off season aired during 2012. Also aired in 2012 were two special episodes, "Operation Bluefin" and "Seal Wars".

Season 6 consisted of a special two-hour episode titled "Whale Wars: A Commander Rises", which was aired on December 13, 2013. It features the Sea Shepherds once again attempting to stop Japanese whaling in the Southern Ocean and the Southern Ocean Whale Sanctuary during the 2013 whaling season.

Series overview

{| class="wikitable plainrowheaders" style="text-align:center;"
! scope="col" style="padding: 0px 8px" colspan="2" rowspan="2" | Season
! scope="col" style="padding: 0px 8px" colspan="2" | Episodes
! scope="col" style="padding: 0px 80px" colspan="2" | Original air dates
|-
! scope="col" | Total
! scope="col" | Specials
! scope="col" | Season premiere
! scope="col" | Season finale
|-
| scope="row" style="background-color: #689CCF; width:10px;" | 
| [[List of Whale Wars episodes#Season 1 (2008)|1]]
| 7
| 
| 
| 
|-
| scope="row" style="background-color: #CC99FF; width:10px;" | 
| [[List of Whale Wars episodes#Season 2 (2009)|2]]
| 11
| 
| 
| 
|-
| scope="row" style="background-color: #66B032; width:10px;" | 
| [[List of Whale Wars episodes#Season 3 (2010)|3]]
| 14
| 1
| 
| 
|-
| scope="row" style="background-color: #FFD700; width:10px;" | 
| [[List of Whale Wars episodes#Season 4 (2011)|4]]
| 12
| 2
| 
| 
|-
| scope="row" style="background-color: #999999; width:10px;" | 
| [[List of Whale Wars episodes#Viking Shores (2012)|Viking Shores]]
| 5
| 
| 
| 
|-
| scope="row" style="background-color: #FF8876; width:10px;" | 
| [[List of Whale Wars episodes#Season 5 (2012)|5]]
| 8
| 
| 
| 
|-
| scope="row" style="background-color: #7700D2; width:10px;" | 
| [[List of Whale Wars episodes#Season 6 (2013)|6]]
| 1
| 
| colspan="2" | 
|-
| scope="row" style="background-color:#3030FF; width:10px;" | 
| [[List of Whale Wars episodes#Season 7 (2015)|7]]
| 3
| 
| colspan="2" | 
|-
| scope="row" style="background-color:#B60000; width:10px;" | 
| [[List of Whale Wars episodes#Other episodes|Other episodes]]
| 2
| 
| 
| 
|}

Notes

Episodes

Season 1 (2008)
Season 1 consisted of 7 episodes and aired from November 7, 2008, to December 19, 2008.  Much of the action depicted in this season occurred between November 2007 and February 2008. Season One is now available on DVD.

The first season of Whale Wars was the most watched program ever for Animal Planet, capturing more than one million viewers for its season finale. Among adults aged 25–54, the series scored the highest viewer ratings in Animal Planet's history.

The first season also received the Television Academy Honors award. The Academy of Television Arts & Sciences created the Television Academy Honors in 2008 to recognize "Television with a Conscience" — achievements in programming that present issues of concern to our society in a compelling, emotional and insightful way.

Season 2 (2009)
The second season of Whale Wars premiered on Animal Planet in the United States on June 5, 2009, in Canada on June 10, 2009, and in the United Kingdom on October 6, 2009. The season was recorded between December 2008 and February 2009.

Season 3 (2010)
At the start of the 2009–10 campaign, Marjorie Kaplan, president and general manager of Animal Planet, said in a news release: "The issues surrounding whaling in the southern ocean are important and complex. The majesty of these beautiful creatures and the lengths to which the Sea Shepherds will go in order to prevent whaling has made Whale Wars intense and vital television." She also said that Japan had denied requests to film on their vessels.

A "sneak preview" trailer of the new season was released by Animal Planet on May 18, 2010. The preview shows the use of laser dazzlers and projectile launchers by Sea Shepherd.

Season 4 (2011)
The ten-episode fourth season began airing on Animal Planet on June 3, 2011. The campaign includes a new interceptor vessel joining the Sea Shepherd fleet –  (or Godzilla) – replacing the role of the Ady Gil.

Viking Shores (2012)
The six-episode spin-off season began airing on Animal Planet on April 27, 2012.

Season 5 (2012)

Season 6 (2013)
Season six consisted of one standalone two hour special that premiered on December 13, 2013, at 9 pm EST.

Season 7 (2015)

Other episodes
There were two special episodes which were aired in 2012 showing Sea Shepherd's other operations.

References

Sea Shepherd Conservation Society
Lists of documentary television series episodes